The Yoruba alphabet (Yoruba: Álífábẹ́ẹ̀tì Yorùbá) is either of two Latin alphabets used to write the Yoruba language, one in Nigeria and one in neighboring Benin. The Nigerian Yoruba alphabet is made up of 25 letters, without C Q V X Z but with the additions of Ẹ, Ọ, Ṣ and Gb. However, many of the excluded consonants are present in several dialectal forms of Yoruba, including V, Z, and other digraphs (like ch, gh, and gw). Central Yoruba dialects also have 2 extra vowels that are allophones of I and U. It is somewhat unusual in that the letter P usually transcribes , being  only in restricted situations like onomatopoeia. The Beninese alphabet has the letters Ɛ and Ɔ, and previously had C.

Sounds

The high and low tones are written with acute and grave accents (á, à), while mid tone is unmarked (a), except for disambiguation on a nasal (n̄, etc.). Combinations of these tones produce falling and rising tones, written e.g. â, ǎ when they are combined on a single vowel letter.

In older signage,  may be used for current .

See also 
Pan-Nigerian alphabet
Yoruba Braille

References 

Yoruba language
Latin alphabets
Writing systems of Africa